The Finance Minister of Bangladesh heads the Ministry of Finance of the Government of Bangladesh. It is one of the most important positions in the Cabinet and the Finance Minister must deal with all the other departments and plays an important role in deciding the funding levels for each.

The Finance Minister is responsible each year for presenting the  government's budget.

List of finance ministers
 Parties

References 

 
 
 

Government ministers of Bangladesh
Finance ministers of Bangladesh
Ministry of Finance (Bangladesh)
Lists of ministers by ministry of Bangladesh